Valdney Freitas da Matta (born April 20, 1971) is a former Brazilian football player.

Club statistics

References

External links

Kawasaki Frontale

1971 births
Living people
Brazilian footballers
J2 League players
Japan Football League (1992–1998) players
Kawasaki Frontale players
Oita Trinita players
Brazilian expatriate footballers
Expatriate footballers in Japan
Association football forwards